Upstart is a public art work by Australian-American artist Clement Meadmore located at the Lynden Sculpture Garden near Milwaukee, Wisconsin. The sculpture is an abstract, twisting form made of weathering steel; it is installed on the lawn.

References

Outdoor sculptures in Milwaukee
1967 sculptures
Steel sculptures in Wisconsin
Sculptures by Clement Meadmore
Abstract sculptures in Wisconsin
1967 establishments in Wisconsin